iCarly is an American sitcom that originally aired on Nickelodeon from September 8, 2007, to November 23, 2012. The series stars Miranda Cosgrove as Carly Shay who becomes an Internet star. Nickelodeon promoted many episodes such as "iDo", "iHire an Idiot", "iPity the Nevel", "iDate Sam & Freddie", etc. as specials, despite being regular episodes. The lower case i which begins the episode titles represents the internet, as in "iCarly". The show was nominated for an Emmy award for Outstanding Children's Program in 2009. The series ended on November 23, 2012, with the one-hour special episode "iGoodbye". A total of six seasons and 109 episodes were produced, broadcast as 97 aired episodes. The largest audience of the series was 11.2 million viewers, with the special episode "iSaved Your Life" premiered in January 2010.

When Carly (Miranda Cosgrove) and her sassy best friend Sam (Jennette McCurdy) act funny at a school talent show audition, tech-savvy Freddie (Nathan Kress) tapes it and posts it online without telling them. After seeing the girls' strong chemistry and banter, the online audience clamors for more and the iCarly webcast is born. While grappling with typical issues of adolescence, Carly, Sam, and Freddie find out that they have also become online celebrities as their show – which features talent contests, recipes, problem-solving, and random dancing – garners international accolades.

Carly lives in Seattle, Washington with her older brother and guardian Spencer (Jerry Trainor) and produces the show in a makeshift third-floor studio loft in their apartment. Their mother has never been seen or mentioned, but their father, Steven Shay (David Chisum), is a United States Air Force officer temporarily stationed on a submarine, and is often mentioned but is briefly seen in person during the series finale episode, "iGoodbye".

Series overview

Episodes

Season 1 (2007–08)

Season 2 (2008–09)

Season 3 (2009–10)

Season 4 (2010–11)

Season 5 (2011–12)

Season 6 (2012)

References

External links
 
 TV Guide's iCarly episode list
 Dan Warp
 

Episodes
Lists of American children's television series episodes
ICarly episodes list of
Lists of Nickelodeon television series episodes